Helga Amélie Lundahl (26 May 1850 – 20 August 1914) was a Finnish painter.

Biography
She was born in Oulu, the youngest of eleven children. Her mother died when she was three months old and her father, Abraham, a Town Representative (public prosecutor) died when she was eight.

From 1860 to 1862, she attended the "Svenska Privatskolan" in Oulu. From 1872 to 1876 she studied at the Academy of Fine Arts, Helsinki, with a brief stay at the School of Art and Design in Stockholm, which was made possible by a travel grant. Another travel grant enabled her to go to Paris, where she studied at the Académie Julian with Tony Robert-Fleury, among others, from 1877 to 1881. She stayed there for twelve years altogether, and Brittany became her favorite location for painting.

After returning to Finland in 1889, she and Victor Westerholm helped to found the "Önningebykolonin", an art colony in the village of Önningeby in Åland.

She died in 1914 in Helsinki. It is believed that her death was caused by leukemia.

Gallery

See also
 Golden Age of Finnish Art
 Finnish art

References

Further reading 
 Pia Maria Montonen: Amélie Lundahl 1850–1914. Ars Nordica 10 (Pohjoinen, Oulu, 1998).

External links

 ArtNet: More works by Lundahl

1850 births
1914 deaths
People from Oulu
19th-century Finnish painters
20th-century Finnish painters
19th-century Finnish women artists
20th-century Finnish women artists
Finnish women painters
Finnish male painters
19th-century Finnish male artists
20th-century Finnish male artists